Chaned is a small village situated in the district of Chamba. This village is well known for its holy Goddess Kali Temple situated near to the main bus-stop of Chaned on National Highway 154A (India).

References

Villages in Chamba district